Víctor Julio Rodríguez Villavicencio (born 27 March 1995) is a Venezuelan boxer. He competed in the men's bantamweight event at the 2016 Summer Olympics.

References

External links
 

1995 births
Living people
Venezuelan male boxers
Olympic boxers of Venezuela
Boxers at the 2016 Summer Olympics
Place of birth missing (living people)
Bantamweight boxers
People from Zulia